Theila is a genus of moths of the family Crambidae. The genus was erected by Charles Swinhoe in 1900.

Species 
 Theila distributa (T. P. Lucas, 1898)
 Theila fusconebulalis (Marion, 1954)
 Theila metallosticha (Turner, 1938)
 Theila siennata (Warren, 1896)
 Theila triplaga (Lower, 1903)

Former species 
 Theila plicatalis (Walker, 1866)

References 

Acentropinae
Crambidae genera
Taxa named by Charles Swinhoe